The Wartrace Horse Show is an annual one-night horse show held in Wartrace, Tennessee. It has been held since 1906 and is traditionally popular with competitors hoping to enter the Tennessee Walking Horse National Celebration later in August.

History
The Wartrace Horse Show was founded in 1906 in Wartrace, Tennessee. It was originally part of a larger stock show and festival, but the popularity of horses in the area warranted the split. For the first 20 years of its existence, it was held on Front Street in Wartrace, but later moved to the showgrounds, Jernigan Field.
The first Wartrace Horse Shows awarded sacks of flour and coffee as prizes, and the town wellhouse was used as a stand for the judges to view the horses. Although Wartrace had a population of 500 people in the early 1900s, the show attracted crowds of approximately 5,000 spectators.  The Wartrace Horse Show is still held on one Saturday night in early August. It remains popular with trainers, amateur riders, and horses hoping to show in the much larger Tennessee Walking Horse National Celebration later in the month.

References

1906 establishments in Tennessee
Sports in Tennessee